Angoya is a rural locality (a settlement) in Severo-Baykalsky District, Republic of Buryatia, Russia. The population was 665 as of 2010. There are 14 streets.

Geography 
Angoya is located 97 km northeast of Nizhneangarsk (the district's administrative centre) by road. Uoyan is the nearest rural locality.

References 

Rural localities in Severo-Baykalsky District